Bertha Oliva Sánchez Rivera (born November 4, 1978) is a female long-distance runner from Colombia, who won several medals on continental level from the mid-1990s on.

Career
She has won twice at the South American Cross Country Championships; first winning the long race in 2000, then winning the short race competition in 2002.

Achievements

References

External links
 
 Profile at the ARRS
 

1978 births
Living people
Colombian female long-distance runners
Colombian female steeplechase runners
Athletes (track and field) at the 1999 Pan American Games
Athletes (track and field) at the 2003 Pan American Games
Athletes (track and field) at the 2008 Summer Olympics
Olympic athletes of Colombia
Place of birth missing (living people)
Pan American Games medalists in athletics (track and field)
Pan American Games silver medalists for Colombia
Pan American Games bronze medalists for Colombia
South American Games bronze medalists for Colombia
South American Games medalists in athletics
Central American and Caribbean Games gold medalists for Colombia
Competitors at the 1998 South American Games
Competitors at the 1998 Central American and Caribbean Games
Competitors at the 2002 Central American and Caribbean Games
Competitors at the 2006 Central American and Caribbean Games
Central American and Caribbean Games medalists in athletics
Medalists at the 1999 Pan American Games
Medalists at the 2003 Pan American Games
Sportspeople from Antioquia Department
20th-century Colombian women
21st-century Colombian women